County Londonderry (Ulster-Scots: Coontie Lunnonderrie), also known as County Derry, is one of the six counties of Northern Ireland, one of the thirty two counties of Ireland and one of the nine counties of Ulster. Before the partition of Ireland, it was one of the counties of the Kingdom of Ireland from 1613 onward and then of the United Kingdom after the Acts of Union 1800.

Since 1972, the counties in Northern Ireland, including Londonderry, have no longer been used by the state as part of the local administration. Following further reforms in 2015, the area is now governed under three different districts; Derry and Strabane, Causeway Coast and Glens and Mid-Ulster. Despite no longer being used for local government and administrative purposes, it is sometimes used in a cultural context in All-Ireland sporting and cultural events (i.e. Derry GAA).

Since 1981, it has become one of four counties in Northern Ireland that has a Catholic majority (55.56% according to the 2001 Census), with 57% of the Catholic population residing within the territory of Derry City Council. The county flower is the purple saxifrage.

Name 
The place name Derry is an anglicisation of the Old Irish Daire (Modern Irish Doire), meaning "oak-grove" or "oak-wood".

As with the city, its name is subject to the Derry/Londonderry name dispute, with the form "Londonderry" generally preferred by unionists and "Derry" by nationalists.  Unlike with the city however, there has never been a County Derry.  County Londonderry was formed mostly from the old County Coleraine (see below). British authorities use the name "Londonderry", while "Derry" is used by the Republic of Ireland.

History

Pre-historic
Mountsandel located near Coleraine in County Londonderry is "perhaps the oldest recorded settlement within Ireland".

County Coleraine and the Plantation of Ulster
At an early period, what became the county of Coleraine was inhabited by the O'Cahans, who were tributary to the O'Neills. Towards the close of the reign of Elizabeth I their territory was seized by England, with the purpose of checking the power of the O'Neills, and was made the county of Coleraine, named after the regional capital.

A short description of County Coleraine is given in Harris's Hibernica, and also in Captain Pynnar's Survey of the Escheated Counties of Ulster, Anno 1618:

On 2 March 1613, James I granted a charter to The Honourable The Irish Society to undertake the plantation of a new county. This county was named Londonderry, a combination of London (in reference to the Livery Companies of the Irish Society) and Derry (then name of the city). This charter declared that the "City of Londonderry" and everything contained within the new county:

This new county would comprise the then County Coleraine—which consisted of the baronies of Tirkeeran, Coleraine, and Keenaght—and at the behest of The Irish Society the following additional territory was added: all but the south-west corner of the barony of Loughinsholin, then a part of County Tyrone, as it had sufficient wood for construction; the North East Liberties of Coleraine, which was part of County Antrim and the City of Londonderry and its Liberties, which were in County Donegal, so that they could control both banks of the River Foyle and River Bann.

The Irish Society was made up of the twelve main livery companies of London, which themselves were composed of various guilds. Whilst The Irish Society as a whole was given possession of the city of Londonderry and Coleraine, the individual companies were each granted an estimated  throughout the county. These companies and the sites of their headquarters were:
Clothworkers, based at Killowen and Clothworker's Hall (present-day Articlave) in the barony of Coleraine;
Drapers, based at Draper's Hall, later called Drapers Town (present-day Moneymore) in the barony of Loughinsholin;
Fishmongers, based at Artikelly and Fishermonger's Hall (present-day Ballykelly) in the barony of Keenaght;
Goldsmiths, based at Goldsmith's Hall (present-day Newbuildings) in the barony of Tirkeeran;
Grocers, based at Grocer's Hall, alias Muff (present-day Eglinton) in the barony of Tirkeeran;
Haberdashers, based at Habberdasher's Hall (present-day Ballycastle) in the barony of Keenaght;
Ironmongers, based at Ironmonger's Hall (present-day townland of Agivey) in the barony of Coleraine;
Mercers, based at Mercer's Hall (present-day townland of Movanagher) in the barony of Coleraine;
Merchant Taylors, based at Merchant Taylor's Hall (present-day Macosquin) in the barony of Coleraine;
Salters, based at Salter's Hall (present-day Magherafelt) and Salters Town in the barony of Loughinsholin;
Skinners, based at Skinner's Hall (present-day Dungiven) in the barony of Keenaght;
Vintners, based at Vintner's Hall, later called Vintner's Town (present-day Bellaghy) in the barony of Loughinsholin.

19th century
As a result of the Local Government (Ireland) Act 1898, the city was detached from the county for administrative purposes, becoming a separate county borough from 1899.  The county town of County Londonderry, and seat of the Londonderry County Council until its abolition in 1973, was therefore moved to the town of Coleraine.

Geography and places of interest

The highest point in the county is the summit of Sawel Mountain on the border with County Tyrone. Sawel is part of the Sperrin Mountains, which dominate the southern part of the county. To the east and west, the land falls into the valleys of the Bann and Foyle rivers respectively; in the south-east, the county touches the shore of Lough Neagh, which is the largest lake in Ireland; the north of the county is distinguished by the steep cliffs, dune systems, and remarkable beaches of the Atlantic coast.

The county is home to a number of important buildings and landscapes, including the well-preserved 17th-century city walls of Derry; the National Trust–owned Plantation estate at Springhill; Mussenden Temple on the Atlantic coast; the dikes, artificial coastlines and the bird sanctuaries on the eastern shore of Lough Foyle; and the visitor centre at Bellaghy Bawn, close to the childhood home of Nobel laureate Seamus Heaney. In the centre of the county are the old-growth deciduous forests at Banagher and Ness Wood, where the Burntollet River flows over the highest waterfalls in Northern Ireland.

Subdivisions 
 Baronies

 Coleraine
 Keenaght
 North East Liberties of Coleraine
 North West Liberties of Londonderry
 Loughinsholin
 Tirkeeran

 Parishes

 Townlands

Settlements
 Cities
(population of 75,000 or more with a cathedral)
 Derry

 Large towns
(population of 18,000 or more and under 75,000 at 2001 Census)
 Coleraine

 Medium towns
(population of 10,000 or more and under 18,000 at 2001 Census)
 Limavady

 Small towns
(population of 4,500 or more and under 10,000 at 2001 Census)
 Magherafelt
 Portstewart
 
 Intermediate settlements
(population of 2,250 or more and under 4,500 at 2001 Census)
 Culmore (part of Derry Urban Area)
 Dungiven
 Eglinton
 Maghera
 Newbuildings (part of Derry Urban Area)

 Villages
(population of 1,000 or more and under 2,250 at 2001 Census)

 Ballykelly
 Bellaghy
 Castledawson
 Castlerock
 Claudy
 Draperstown
 Garvagh
 Greysteel
 Kilrea
 Moneymore
 Strathfoyle (part of Derry Urban Area)

 Small villages or hamlets
(population of less than 1,000 at 2001 Census)

 Articlave
 Ballerin
 Ballymaguigan
 Ballyronan
 Clady
 Culnady
 Desertmartin
 Downhill
 Drumsurn
 Feeny
 Glenullin
 Gulladuff
 Lettershendoney
 Macosquin
 Ringsend
 Swatragh
 Tobermore
 Upperlands

Administration 
The county was administered by Londonderry County Council from 1899 until the abolition of county councils in Northern Ireland in 1973. They were replaced by district councils. These councils were: Londonderry City Council (renamed Derry City Council in 1984), Limavady Borough Council, and Magherafelt District Council, most of Coleraine Borough Council, and part of Cookstown District Council. After a reduction in the number of councils in Northern Ireland in 2011, County Londonderry is divided into three cross-county councils: Causeway Coast and Glens, Derry and Strabane, and Mid-Ulster District.

Transport 

There is also the Foyle Valley Railway, a museum in Derry with some rolling stock from both the County Donegal Railway and the Londonderry and Lough Swilly Railway, and is located on the site of the former Londonderry Foyle Road railway station. The Londonderry and Lough Swilly Railway continued as a private bus company based in the city but operating predominantly in County Donegal until it closed in 2014. Bus services are now provided by Ulsterbus.

Education 
Government-funded education up to secondary school level is administered by the Education Authority (EA), sponsored by the Department of Education. The EA is divided into sub-regions:

 Western region: Derry, Limavady;
 North Eastern region: Coleraine, Magherafelt;
 Southern region: Cookstown.

For Catholic grant-maintained schools administration is by the Derry Diocesan Education Office.

Two major centres of the University of Ulster are in the county, including its headquarters at Coleraine and the Magee Campus in Derry.

Sport 

In Gaelic games, the GAA county of Derry is more or less coterminous with the former administrative county of Londonderry, although teams from the neighbouring counties of Tyrone, Donegal and Antrim have occasionally played in Derry competitions, and vice versa. The Derry teams wear the colours red and white. There are many club teams competing in up to five leagues and three championships. The county team has won one All-Ireland Senior Football Championship (in 1993) and five National League titles. Hurling is also widely played but is not as popular as football. However, the county team is generally regarded as one of the top hurling sides in Ulster and in 2006 won the Nicky Rackard Cup – the third tier hurling competition in Ireland.

In association football, the NIFL Premiership, which operates as the top division, has two teams in the county: Coleraine F.C. and Institute F.C., with Limavady United F.C., Moyola Park F.C., Portstewart F.C. and Tobermore United F.C. competing in the NIFL Championship, which operates as levels two and three. Derry City F.C. play in the Premier Division of the League of Ireland after leaving the Northern Ireland structures in 1985, having resigned from the Irish Football League at the height of the Troubles because of not being allowed play their home games at the Brandywell due to security concerns from other clubs.

The Northern Ireland Milk Cup was established in 1983 and is regarded as one of the most prestigious youth football tournaments in Europe and the world. The competition is based at Coleraine and involves several other towns and villages in the county – Limavady, Portstewart and Castlerock – and in neighbouring County Antrim – Ballymoney, Portrush, Ballymena and Broughshane. The event, held in the last week of July, has attracted teams from 56 countries around the world including Europe, the US, Africa, the Far East, South America, the Middle East, Australia, Russia, New Zealand and Canada. Some of the biggest teams in the world have entered including Premiership giants Everton, Liverpool, Manchester United, Chelsea, Tottenham Hotspur as well as top European teams such as Feyenoord, F.C. Porto, FC Barcelona, Benfica, Bayern Munich and Dynamo Kiev.

In rugby union, the county is represented at senior level by Rainey Old Boys Rugby Club, Magherafelt who compete in the Ulster Senior League and All Ireland Division Three. Limavady R.F.C, City of Derry Rugby Club, Londonderry Y.M.C.A and Coleraine Rugby Club all compete in Ulster Qualifying League One.

Cricket is particularly popular in the north-west of Ireland, with 11 of the 20 senior clubs in the North West Cricket Union located in County Londonderry: Limavady, Eglinton, Glendermott, Brigade, Killymallaght, Ardmore, Coleraine, Bonds Glen, Drummond, Creevedonnell and The Nedd.

In rowing, Richard Archibald from Coleraine along with his Irish teammates qualified for the Beijing 2008 Olympics by finishing second in the lightweight fours final in Poznań, thus qualifying for the Beijing 2008 Olympics. Another Coleraine rower Alan Campbell is a World Cup gold medallist in the single sculls in 2006.

Media 
The county currently has four main radio stations:

 BBC Radio Foyle;
 Q102.9;
 Q97.2;
 Six FM (in the south of the county).

See also 
 Abbeys and priories in Northern Ireland (County Londonderry)
 List of places in County Londonderry
 List of townlands in County Londonderry
 List of civil parishes of County Londonderry
 Lord Lieutenant of County Londonderry
 High Sheriff of County Londonderry

References

External links

County Londonderry on the interactive map of the counties of Great Britain and Ireland – Wikishire

 
Counties of Northern Ireland
Londonderry
1613 establishments in Ireland